The 1931–32 Purdue Boilermakers men's basketball team represented Purdue University during the 1931–32 NCAA men's basketball season in the United States. The head coach was Ward Lambert, coaching in his 15th season with the Boilermakers. The team finished the season with a 17–1 record and was retroactively named the national champion by the Helms Athletic Foundation and the Premo-Porretta Power Poll.

Future Basketball Hall of Famer as both a player and a coach, John Wooden, was a senior on this team. He was named the national player of the year after leading the successful Boilermakers with an impressive 12.1 points per game average (back when scoring was much lower than it is today, 12 points was a significant average).

The team also contained several future coaches; Eddy in the Indiana High School ranks before returning to Purdue; Fehring in the California collegiate ranks and Moore in the nascent pro ranks.

Lineup
Source
 Ray Eddy – Forward
 Harry Kellar – Forward
 Charles Stewart – Center
 William "Dutch" Fehring – Center
 John Wooden – Guard
 Ralph Parmerter – Guard
 Doxie Moore – ?

Schedule and results

|-
!colspan=9| Regular season

Source

References

Purdue Boilermakers men's basketball seasons
Purdue
Purdue Boilermakers Men's Basketball Team
Purdue Boilermakers Men's Basketball Team